California Proposition 63 may refer to:

 California Proposition 63 (1986) - Official State Language. Initiative Constitutional Amendment
 California Proposition 63 (2004) - California Mental Health Services Act (MHSA)
 California Proposition 63 (2016) - Firearms and Ammunition Sales